Ocean Victory was a  cargo ship that was built in 1942 for the British Ministry of War Transport (MoWT). In 1943, she was transferred to the Dutch Government and renamed Jan Steen. In 1946, she was sold into merchant service and renamed Amstelveen. A sale to Hong Kong in 1959 saw her renamed Polly. She served until 1963 when she was scrapped.

Description
The ship was an Ocean ship. She was built by Permanente Metals Corporation, Richmond, California in Kaiser Richmond No. 1 Yard.; launched from their Yard No.1 on 27 June 1942, and was completed in July 1942.

History

Ocean Victory was completed in July 1942. She was placed under the management of McCowan and Cross, Liverpool. Her port of registry was Liverpool. Ocean Victory was allocated the Code Letters BDYG and the United Kingdom Official Number 165837. She was a member of a number of convoys during the Second World War.

KMS 3G
Convoy KMS 3G departed the Clyde on 8 November 1942 bound for Gibraltar. Ocean Victory was a member of this convoy.

MKS 4
Convoy MKS 4 departed Bône, Algeria on 22 December 1942 and arrived at Liverpool on 6 January 1943. Ocean Victory was bound for Swansea.

In 1943, Ocean Victory was transferred to the Dutch government-in-exile. She was renamed Jan Steen and placed under the management of NV Stoomvaart Maatschappij Nederland. The Code Letters PEZR were allocated.

Jan Steen was a member of a number of convoys during the Second World War.

MKS 51
Convoy MKS 51 departed Bône on 6 June 1944 bound for the United Kingdom. Jan Steen had started her voyage at Alexandria, Egypt and was bound for the United Kingdom carrying general cargo and mail. The convoy departed Gibraltar on 9 June 1944.

MKS 58
Convoy MKS 58 departed Alexandria on 8 August 1944 bound for the United Kingdom. Jan Steen joined the convoy at Bizerta, Tunisia and left it at Algiers, Algeria.

MKS 62
Convoy MKS 62 departed Port Said, Egypt on 16 September 1944 bound for the United Kingdom. Jan Steen joined the convoy at Augusta, Italy and left it at Algiers.

MKS 78G
Convoy MKS 78G departed Gibraltar on 21 January 1945 bound for the United Kingdom. Jan Steen was a member of this convoy, she was carrying a cargo of oranges.

Post-war, and fate

Caritas I was beached but broke in two and sank the next day. Jan Steen was sold to NV Reederij Amsterdam, Amsterdam in 1947 and was renamed Amstelveen.

In 1959, Amstelveen was sold to Eddie Steamship Co Ltd, Hong Kong and was renamed Polly. She served until 1963 when she was scrapped at Kaohsiung, Taiwan.

References

1942 ships
Ships built in Richmond, California
Ministry of War Transport ships
Steamships of the United Kingdom
World War II merchant ships of the United Kingdom
Steamships of the Netherlands
World War II merchant ships of the Netherlands
Merchant ships of the Netherlands
Maritime incidents in 1947
Steamships of Hong Kong
Merchant ships of Hong Kong